Manglares de Tumbes National Sanctuary is a protected natural area located in the region of Tumbes, Peru. Established in 1988, it protects the largest area of mangrove forest in Peru.

Geography 
This protected area is located in Zarumilla Province, Tumbes; close to the border with Ecuador.

Ecology

Flora 
Five species of mangrove dominate the area: black mangrove (Avicennia germinans), white mangrove (Laguncularia racemosa), button mangrove (Conocarpus erectus) and two species of red mangrove (Rhizophora mangle and Rhizophora harrisonii). Seasonally dry forest and scrubland can also be found in some parts of the sanctuary; tree species representative of this ecosystem being: Pithecellobium excelsum, Cordia lutea, Mimosa acantholoba, Parkinsonia praecox, Ceiba trischistandra, Loxopterygium huasango, Bursera graveolens, Cochlospermum sp., Prosopis pallida, Capparis scabrida; and some seasonal herbaceous species also found here are: Aristida adscencionis, Bouteloua aristidoides, Stylosanthes sp., Crotalaria sp.,Tephrosia cinerea, Cyperus sp., Scirpus sp., Distichlis spicata, Antephora hermaphrodita, Paspalum racemosum, Ipomoea sp., Bidens pilosa, among others.

Fauna 
The sanctuary protects 148 species of birds, being some of them the yellow-crowned night heron, the rufous-necked wood rail, the American yellow warbler and the American white ibis.

The sanctuary also protects 105 fish species, plus some other 40 migrant species.

Mammals found in the area include the crab-eating raccoon, the silky anteater and the neotropical otter.

Also, 33 snail species, 34 crustacean species, 24 bivalve species and 9 reptile species are found in the sanctuary.

Recreation
It is possible to navigate, by kayak or canoe, the waterways inside the mangrove forest in the zone accessible to tourists (137,5 hectares = 4,61% of the sanctuary). In this area activities like walking on beaches, birdwatching and observation of the use of the mangrove ecosystem by the locals are also allowed.

Scientific research has been a constant activity since the creation of the sanctuary.

Environmental issues 
The clearance of mangrove forests and nearby seasonally dry forests to open land for shrimp farming and agriculture has an enormous impact on local ecosystems. Shrimp farms also capture and grow larva of local shrimp species from the mangrove forests with help of local inhabitants. These farms and agricultural lands also pollute the area with industrial waste and agricultural runoff.

Illegal extraction of edible crustaceans and bivalves; conflicts over land use rights with nearby villages and litter and wastewater discharge from nearby towns into the mangrove forest canals are also environmental issues affecting the sanctuary.

Introduced plant species like Tephrosia purpurea, Dactyloctenium aegyptium, Eragrostis cilianensis and Brachiaria mutica are found growing inside this protected area.

The American crocodile is no longer present in the area, rendering this species as one of the most threatened in the country.

References

External links 

 Manglares de Tumbes National Sanctuary. Profile at protectedplanet.net

National sanctuaries of Peru
Ramsar sites in Peru
Geography of Tumbes Region
Tourist attractions in Tumbes Region